Chen Junzhou (born 23 August 2000) is a Chinese footballer currently playing as a forward for Guangzhou.

Career statistics

Club
.

References

2000 births
Living people
Chinese footballers
Association football forwards
Guangzhou F.C. players